is a Japanese actress and voice actress from Tokyo. She is represented by two talent agencies: 81 Produce and Caramel Box, and was formerly represented as a stage actor by Theatre Echo.

Filmography

Television animation
Bonobono (Nagareboshi-kun)
Brave Police J-Decker (Yuta Tomonaga)
Buckets de Gohan (Rīchi)
Cynical History Hour (Tsuneko)
Crayon Shin-chan (Atsuko Kutsuzoko)
Daigunder (Makoto)
Detective Conan (girl)
Dr. Slump (the Prince)
El Hazard: The Alternative World (Parnasse)
Flint the Time Detective (Rodan)
Hamtaro (Oasis-kun) / (Omar)
Imagination Science World Gulliver Boy ( James the 2nd)
Kindaichi Shōnen no Jikenbo (1997) (Chris Einstien, ep.13-15)
Kurogane Communication (Spike)
Mahōjin Guru Guru (Zaza)
Mobile Suit Victory Gundam (Francesca O'Hara)
Mokke (Kazuma Hiyoshi, ep.17)
Nintama Rantarō (Ibuki, Naomi)
Pluster World (Harnia)
Pokémon (Tsukushi)Romeo no Aoi Sora (Michaelo)Shaman King (Kagami)The Simpsons (Della)Trapp Ikka Monogatari (Johanna)Yamato Takeru (Manta, Namuji)

Sources:

Radio
Final Fantasy Tactics Advance (Doned Radiuju)

References

External links
81 Produce profile 
Caramel Box profile 
Japan Animation Creators Association profile 
Japanese Movie Database profile 

1961 births
Living people
Voice actresses from Tokyo
Japanese voice actresses
81 Produce voice actors